Can Arduman (born 1959 in İstanbul) is a Turkish chess player. He is a six-time Turkish Chess Champion.

Arduman was born in 1959 in Istanbul, started playing chess at the age of 11, earned FIDE title, International Master (IM) in 1996. He won the 1993,1994,1996,1997,1998 and 2002 Turkish Chess Championship.

References

External links 
 
 

1959 births
Living people
Turkish chess players
Chess International Masters